The 1942–43 Svenska mästerskapet was the 12th season of Svenska mästerskapet, a tournament held to determine the Swedish Champions of men's handball. Teams qualified by winning their respective District Championships. 19 teams competed in the tournament. Majornas IK were the defending champions, and won their fourth title, defeating Västerås HF in the final. The final was played on 18 April in Mässhallen in Gothenburg, and was watched by 1,900 spectators.

Results

First round 
Bodens BK–Umeå IK result unknown
Västerås HF–GUIF 10–6
Motala AIF–IFK Örebro 13–12 a.e.t.
Norslunds IF–Sandvikens IF 5–22

Second round
Umeå IK–Sollefteå GIF 13–15
Västerås HF–Motala AIF 17–9
IF Leikin–Ystads IF HF w/o
IF Hallby–IFK Karlskrona w/o
Visby AIK–IFK Lidingö 6–13
Upsala IF–Sandvikens IF 15–5
GF Kroppskultur–Majornas IK 12–29

Quarterfinals
Sollefteå GIF–Västerås HF 8–11
Ystads IF HF–IFK Karlskrona 13–6
IFK Lidingö–Upsala IF 12–8 a.e.t.
IFK Skövde–Majornas IK 10–27

Semifinals
Västerås HF–Ystads IF HF 9–8
IFK Lidingö–Majornas IK 7–14

Final
Majornas IK–Västerås HF 14–8

Champions 
The following players for Majornas IK received a winner's medal: Bertil Huss, Stig Neptun (1 goal in the final), Claes Hedenskog (2), Sven-Eric Forsell (1), Stig Hjortsberg (3), Åke Gustafsson (2), Gustav-Adolf Thorén (1), Gunnar Lindgren (2), Torsten Henriksson (2) and Bo Sundby.

See also
1941–42 Allsvenskan (men's handball)

References 

Swedish handball competitions